Preeti Dahiya  is an Indian amateur boxer. She was a Gold medallist at the 2019 Asian Junior Boxing Championship.

Early life 
Preeti Dahiya was born on 16 June 2004 in Delhi in Fateh Nagar, Delhi, India, but she and her family belong to Silana Village of Haryana state's sonipat district. Her father, Harinder Dahiya is a farmer, and her mother, Poonam is a housewife.

Career
She started boxing in 2016 after taking inspiration from Indian kabaddi team captain Deepak Niwas Hooda. After six months of training under the coach Mahendra Singh Dhaka, she won silver medal at the school-level national championships in the same year. She continued her training and in 2019 she won gold medal in the Asian junior boxing championship. She won the lightweight division (60 kg) of the 2021 ASBC Asian youth boxing championships after defeated Kazakhstan's Zuldyz Shayakmetova 3–2.

References 

Boxers from Haryana
Living people
Indian women boxers
Year of birth missing (living people)
21st-century Indian women